The 1717 Guatemala earthquake struck colonial Guatemala on September 29 with an estimated moment magnitude of 7.4, and a Mercalli intensity of approximately IX (Violent). The earthquake essentially destroyed much of the architecture of Antigua Guatemala, which was the colonial capital of Central America at the time. Over 3,000 buildings were ruined including many temples and churches. Such was the effect of the disaster that the authorities considered moving the headquarters to a settlement which was less prone to natural disasters.

Later earthquakes meant that after the 1773 earthquake the town had been moved three times.

See also
 List of earthquakes in Guatemala
 List of historical earthquakes

References

Earthquakes in Guatemala
Guatemala Earthquake, 1717
Guatemala Earthquake, 1717
Earthquake 1717
Guatemala Earthquake 1717
Earthquake 1717